These are the international rankings of Pakistan.

Geography

Cereals, Fruits and Livestock Production
Source is Food and Agriculture Organization

Cities

Demographics

Economy

Industry

Environment

Energy

Military

Political

Communications
Following rankings involving technological advances in communication are taken from the CIA World Factbook.

Sports

Awards

See also
Lists of countries
Lists by country
List of international rankings

References

External links
 CIA World Factbook

Pakistan